Springdale station is a commuter rail station on the New Canaan Branch of the Metro-North Railroad New Haven Line in Stamford, Connecticut. The station opened in 1868, and was rebuilt in 1972.

History

The Springdale station began as a stop on the New Canaan Railroad, which was chartered May 1866 as a short branch of the New York and New Haven Railroad. The line opened on July 4, 1868. As with the rest of the New Haven Railroad, the station was acquired by Penn Central Railroad in 1969. The station's staffed ticket office closed on January 15, 1972.

By 2010, after condominiums were built on nearby Camp Avenue, the station became more crowded. In April 2010, construction started on a 400-foot, $1 million canopy on the station platform. Gar-San Corporation of Watertown won the $1.87 million contract for the project. (The company was to build an identical canopy at the Stratford train station.) A large part of the expense came from having the foundation for the canopy to be drilled into the ground because of space constraints. Completion of the project was expected in December.

Station layout
The station has one four-car-long high-level side platform to the west of the single track. The station has a ramp to the platforms, but it was built before the Americans with Disabilities Act and may not meet ADA accessibility requirements. The station is owned and operated by the Connecticut Department of Transportation (ConnDOT), with some responsibilities delegated to Metro-North.

A parking lot is located at the west side of the station off Hope Street. Station parking is controlled by Stamford city government, which owns most of the parking lot. The state owns a much smaller parking area at the south end of the station. The parking lot has landscaping and a "period pedestal clock".

References

External links

 Station from Largo Road entrance from Google Maps Street View
 http://www.ct.gov/dot/lib/dot/documents/dpt/1_Station_Inspection_Summary_Report.pdf

Metro-North Railroad stations in Connecticut
Stations along New York, New Haven and Hartford Railroad lines
Buildings and structures in Stamford, Connecticut
Railroad stations in Fairfield County, Connecticut